Kane Township may refer to:

 Kane Township, Greene County, Illinois
 Kane Township, Benton County, Iowa
 Kane Township, Pottawattamie County, Iowa, in Pottawattamie County, Iowa
 Kane Township, Bottineau County, North Dakota

Township name disambiguation pages